Jurassic World is a 2015 American science fiction adventure film and the fourth film in the Jurassic Park film series.

Jurassic World may also refer to:

Film and television
 Jurassic World: Fallen Kingdom, a 2018 sequel to Jurassic World; the fifth film in the Jurassic Park film series
 Jurassic World Dominion, a 2022 sequel to Jurassic World: Fallen Kingdom; the sixth film in the Jurassic Park film series
 Jurassic World Camp Cretaceous, a 2020 animated television series serving as a prequel to Jurassic World

Attractions
 Jurassic World: The Ride, a Universal Studios Hollywood theme park ride based on the Jurassic World films

Soundtracks
 Jurassic World (film score), the soundtrack album for the 2015 film
 Jurassic World: Fallen Kingdom (film score), the soundtrack album for the 2018 film
 Jurassic World Dominion (film score), the soundtrack album for the 2022 film

Video games
 Jurassic World: The Game, 2015
 Lego Jurassic World, 2015
 Jurassic World Evolution, 2018
 Jurassic World Evolution 2, 2022

See also
 Jurassic Park (disambiguation)